Étude de perfectionnement de la methode des methodes are two pieces by the Hungarian composer Franz Liszt, composed in 1842 and 1852. The first piece is called Morceau de salon, S.142, followed by a revision, Ab Irato, S.143, both composed in E minor. They are regarded as eccentric pieces with beautiful interludes of arpeggiated figures, though both are rarely performed.

External links 
 

Études by Franz Liszt
Compositions in E minor
1842 compositions
1852 compositions